Minuscule 223 (in the Gregory-Aland numbering), α 263 (Von Soden numbering), is a Greek minuscule manuscript of the New Testament, on parchment. Palaeographically it has been assigned to the 14th-century. Formerly it was labeled by 223a and 277p.
Scrivener labelled it by 220a and 264p.

Description 

The codex contains the text of the Acts, Pauline, and Catholic epistles on 376 parchment leaves (size ), with some lacunae (first leaves in 2 Corinthians with 1:1-3, Ephesians with 1:1-4, and Hebrews with 1:1-6). The text is written in one column per page, 22-23 lines per page, on fine vellum with broad margins. Titles in gold, initial letters ornamented, brilliantly illuminated.

The illuminations are given before each book.

Text 

The Greek text of the codex is a representative of the Byzantine text-type. Aland placed it in Category V.

History 

The manuscript was written by Antonius, a monk. According to the colophon the manuscript was written by Antonios of Malaka in 1244. Dating of the manuscript is problematic, possibly the colophon was not inserted by original scribe. It was examined by Scrivener and Gregory (1883).

Formerly it was labeled by 223a and 277p. In 1908 C. R. Gregory gave number 223 for it.

It is currently housed at the University of Michigan Library (Ms. 34), at Ann Arbor, Michigan.

See also 

 List of New Testament minuscules
 Biblical manuscript
 Textual criticism

Notes

References

Further reading 

 F. H. A. Scrivener, Adversaria critica sacra (Cambridge, 1893). 
 K. W. Clark, Eight American Praxapostoloi, (Chicago, 1941).

External links 

 Minuscule 223 at the Encyclopedia of Textual Criticism
 Images from Minuscule 223 at the CSNTM

Greek New Testament minuscules
14th-century biblical manuscripts